"Under ytan" is a song written by Uno Svenningsson and recorded by him for his debut album as a solo artist, Uno, released in 1994. It was released as a single the same year. The song, which opens with the cello being played, was also used by insurance companies in an anti-violence campaign. In 1998, the song was recorded by Blues.

Charts

Blues version

Other recordings

In 2015, Loreen recorded a version. It was released as a single on 18 December 2015, simultaneously when she performed it live on TV on at Svenska Hjältar-Galan. It is her first single released in the Swedish language.

Loreen turned the guitar pop track into a moody, electronic ballad which starts out with just her voice and some synths, but halfway through explodes with a lush production and more vocal power. 

Michael from 'A Bit of Pop Music said; "This type of moody electro ballads suits her powerful and mystical sounding vocals the best." requesting more of this on her second album.

Scandipop said; ""Under Ytan" [is] a stark and dramatic new production that builds into something special."

In 2017, Kikki Danielsson recorded the song during Så mycket bättre. The song was then called "At the Border", depicting the situation of refugees throughout the world.

References 

1994 singles
2015 singles
Swedish songs
Swedish-language songs
1994 songs
Songs written by Uno Svenningsson
Kikki Danielsson songs
Loreen (singer) songs
Uno Svenningsson songs